Park im. Marszałka Józefa Piłsudskiego, Września (English: Marshal Józef Piłsudski Park, Września) is a park and memorial in Września in (Września County, in Poland). The park is managed by gmina Września.

The park features a pond, playgrounds, natural monuments and sports facilities. In 2002, a municipal swimming pool, which serves as a skating rink during winter, was built in the neighbourhood of the park. A skatepark was added in 2006.

Location 
The park is located in the northern part of the city. The main entrance to the park in the form of a gate and stairs is located on the side of Daszyński street. It is bordered by Parkowa street and the river Wrześnica.

History 
For this purpose, the land was purchased from Helena Mycielska. The project was overseen by the director of urban gardens in Poznan Dr. Wladyslaw Marciniec. The plan provided for flower beds, tennis courts, children's playgrounds, a restaurant building and nursery trees. The park became available to residents on the day of Corpus Christi, June 16, 1927. It was initially named Wiosna Ludów (Polish Revolution of 1848), and in 1935 was renamed after Józef Piłsudski. About 500 trees and more than 7 thousand shrubs were planted in the park and in 1927-1928 more than 30 benches were purchased. Edward Grabski from Bieganowo presented the park with three statues the god of thunder-Perkun, the god of conflagration-Jesse and the goddess of war-Bellona.

Nature 
In the park, there are a variety of species of trees and shrubs, both deciduous and coniferous. There are 43 species of trees and 21 species of shrubs, but the park is dominated by alder and black poplar as well as oak, maple, plane and black walnut. In the central part of the park there is a small pond.

Natural monuments include an erratic block of granite.

Gallery

Sources 
  History of the Park im. Marszałka Józefa Piłsudskiego, Września
   Park im. Marszałka Józefa Piłsudskiego, Września photo gallery

Września
Parks in Greater Poland Voivodeship